Democratic Union (abbreviated DEU) was a liberal political party in the Czech Republic. It existed since 1994 and was dissolved in 2001 when it merged with 
Freedom Union.

History
The party first participated in 1996 legislative election but failed to reach 5% threshold. The party later joined Four-Coalition.

DEU merged with Freedom Union in 2000, and Freedom Union changed its name to Freedom Union – Democratic Union. Members of DEU founded a relatively independent platform, whose members later tried, unsuccessfully, to take over the leadership. Platform then left the party and established Democratic Union of the Czech Republic (DEU ČR).

Election results

Chamber of deputies of the Czech Republic

References

1994 establishments in the Czech Republic
2001 disestablishments in the Czech Republic
Defunct political parties in the Czech Republic

Liberal conservative parties in the Czech Republic
Liberal parties in the Czech Republic
Political parties disestablished in 2001
Political parties established in 1994
Right-wing parties in the Czech Republic